Fleur Jaeggy (born 31 July 1940) is a Swiss author who writes in Italian. The Times Literary Supplement named Proleterka as a Best Book of the Year upon its US publication, and her Sweet Days of Discipline won the Premio Bagutta and the Premio Speciale Rapallo. As of 2021, six of her books have been translated into English.

Life

She was born in Zürich. 

After completing her studies in Switzerland, Jaeggy went to live in Rome, where she met Ingeborg Bachmann and Thomas Bernhard. In 1968 she went to Milan to work for the publisher Adelphi Edizioni and married Roberto Calasso. Her first masterpiece was the novel I beati anni del castigo (1989). The Times Literary Supplement designated her novel Proleterka the best book of 2003. She is also a translator into Italian of Marcel Schwob and Thomas de Quincey.

She worked with the Italian musician Franco Battiato, under the pseudonym of Carlotta Wieck.

Selected bibliography

Fiction
Il dito in bocca (Adelphi, 1968). 
L'angelo custode (Adelphi, 1971).
Le statue d'acqua (Adelphi, 1980). The Water Statues, trans. Gini Alhadeff (New Directions, 2021).
I beati anni del castigo (Adelphi, 1989). Sweet Days of Discipline, trans. Tim Parks (Heinemann/New Directions, 1993; And Other Stories, 2018).
La paura del cielo (Adelphi, 1994). Last Vanities, trans. Tim Parks (New Directions, 1998).
Proleterka (Adelphi, 2001). S. S. Proleterka, trans. Alastair McEwen (New Directions, 2003; And Other Stories, 2019).
Vite congetturali (Adelphi, 2009). These Possible Lives, trans. Minna Zallman Proctor (New Directions, 2017).
Sono il fratello di XX (Adelphi, 2014). I Am the Brother of XX, trans. Gini Alhadeff (New Directions/And Other Stories, 2017).

Translations into Italian
 Marcel Schwob, Vite immaginarie (Adelphi, 1972).
 Thomas de Quincey, Gli ultimi giorni di Immanuel Kant (Adelphi, 1983).

References

External links
Fleur Jaeggy on ItaliaLibri

Wollen, Audrey, "The Circuitous Sublime" (Review of Sweet Days of Discipline, The Water Statues, and I Am the Brother of XX.)

1940 births
Italian women writers
Italian writers
Living people
Swiss writers
Writers from Zürich
Swiss women writers